Louis St. Laurent Catholic School is a fine arts oriented Junior and Senior High School in the Edmonton Catholic School District, located in south western Edmonton. It is also known as "Louis" or "LSL" by the population. The school averages a student body of approximately 1,000 or more pupils each year, spanning grades 7–12. From 2009-2022, the entire school participated in the International Baccalaureate programme. As of 2016, a few students participate in the Spanish Bilingual program. As of 2021, the school incorporates the Advanced Placement curriculum. In 2022, Spark Academy was introduced.

History
Louis St. Laurent School is a combination junior/senior high school in the Edmonton Catholic School District, created by combining the former Cartier McGee Junior High School, built in 1966,  and Louis St. Laurent High School, built in 1968. The junior high side of the school is still referred to as the Cartier McGee side. In 1974, a central hallway was constructed to connect the two schools on the ground floor. The connector was further modified in 1993 to include a large ancillary room, which serves as a meeting room and lunch hall, as well as facilitating other activities that require a large, open space. From 2016 to 2018, it underwent renovations that made some changes to the building. In 2016, it officially became a bilingual school. The school is named for the 12th Prime Minister of Canada, Louis Stephen St. Laurent.

Events

S.M.A.S.H 
Louis St. Laurent is considered to be a fine-arts based Catholic School, though it is also known for its athletic teams, especially volleyball. Every year near the end of October, the school holds a volleyball tournament called "S.M.A.S.H". Teams from various places in Alberta and British Columbia participate in this three-day event. It allows the junior and senior high students to unite and cheer for their varsity men's and women's volleyball high school teams. Students are also in control of some aspects of the tournament. The Student Union hosts the tournaments. A student from the high school art program has their design become the logo for the year. To show school pride, the students of Louis St. Laurent can usually be seen wearing green and yellow and/or their halloween costume to support their team. Every student in the school watches the opening ceremony of the tournament and the first game with a LSL team playing against one of the visiting teams, before being dismissed to regular classes.

Performers 
 Drum battle - a drum battle between a few high school students
 Smash Dancers - a group of students who perform a dance routine
 Louis Crew - the hip hop dance crew
 Teachers' Dance - a dance performance by a few teachers and staff

Green and Gold Classic
Green and Gold Classic is the high school basketball tournament. It takes place a week after the Christmas break. Unlike S.M.A.S.H., the opening ceremony is not attended by the whole school. Only the junior high students participate in the events. Teams from all over Alberta come to participate. It features mostly provincially ranked 3A teams.

Performers 

 Louis Crew - the hip hop dance crew
 Dance - students from the dance class

Big Band Night 
Louis St. Laurent hosts Big Band Night. It is an event in which a few schools' Jazz band performs. It is a concert in which students can come and dance to the music performed by Louis' Instrumental Jazz Band and other bands.

Fine Arts 
As a fine arts school, Louis St. Laurent offers multiple programs from grades 7-12. Most of the programs are progressive, requiring you to stay with the program as you progress. In grade 7, each student has the opportunity to select various classes that they wish to participate in. As they progress through school, they have the option to drop the class; or add the if they meet the necessary requirements. Although fine arts is the focus of the school, not all the students participate in it. Many come to the school for their athletics or academic programs.

Fine Arts programs: 

 Art - this program offers a chance for students to learn about art. Comes in various levels and abilities. A couple of showcases throughout the year.
 Dance - allows students to learn about different types of dance and different styles. Has various performances throughout the year. Comes in various levels and abilities. An Intensive program is available.
 Drama - a class that teaches students about the world of acting. Has various performances during the year. Comes in various levels and abilities. An Intensive program is available.
 Music - teaches students about music. Is mandatory in grade 7, and requires that students stay in the program to continue through the levels. Has various performances. Has a variety of bands.

Academics

Spanish Bilingual Program 
Louis St. Laurent offers the option for some students to take some of their classes in Spanish. It is available for student in grades 7-11. They are able to learn Spanish along with their other courses. Two homeroom classes in junior high are reserved for students in the Spanish bilingual program. Half of these students are in both classes and they meet for their classes. In high school, they can continue with the program.

International Baccalaureate (IB) 
As an IB school, Louis St. Laurent offered a variety IB classes; both Standard Level and Higher Level. All students in grade 7-10 were enrolled in the Middle Year Program. In grade 11, students had the option of staying in the 2-year International Baccalaureate (IB) Program Diploma Program (DP); or continuing in the standard Albertan high school classes. They could have choose to either take individual classes or graduate with an IB degree in addition with an Alberta High School Degree.

The classes offered were: English (HL), French (SL), Spanish (HL/SL/ab initio), History (HL), Biology (HL), Chemistry (SL), Mathematics (SL), Visual Arts (SL), Theatre (SL), Dance (SL), and Music (SL).

As of 2021, the school no longer offers IB. It is now an AP school.

Advanced Placement (AP) 
In 2021, there was an announcement made that the school would switch from an IB school, to an AP school. Many of the IB courses offered are now given through the AP curriculum. They offer in-class and online options. The in-class courses are: English Literature and Composition, Calculus AB, Physics 1, and Biology. The online courses are: Statistics, Environmental Sciences, European History, Art History, and Chemistry.

Enhanced Academic Program (EAP) 
The EAP is a program designed to prepare junior high students for "high intellectual engagement by starting the development of skills and acquisition of knowledge as early as possible". It includes more vigorous learning and challenges students. The goal of the program is to prepare students for higher academic programs such as AP.

Spark Academy 
The ECSD Spark Academy is a program that integrates creativity with STEM. Students "learn...skills in computers, coding and robotics, CAD and 3D printing, audio/video production, automation, and game theory".

WIN SR 
An acronym standing for "Whatever is Necessary, Whenever it’s Needed". It is an inclusive program designed to help students with mild to severe cognitive needs obtain a Certificate of Completion.

English Second Language (ESL) 
As some students are new to Canada, Louis St. Laurent offers a program to help teach students English. These students are taught English during school time to help with their proficiency.

French Second Language 
As part of the nine-year program, students at Louis St. Laurent are taught, French. This is the default language taught. The majority of the student population is in the French program in junior high. In high school, they transition to the three-year program. This is taught in conjunction to the IB French course.

Athletics 
Athletics is one of the focuses of Louis St. Laurent. There are a variety of sports teams available for students to participate in.

Teams 
The sports teams that are available for students to try out in and play for are: Badminton, Basketball, Cross-Country Running, Curling, Golf, Soccer, Softball, Swimming, Track and Field, and Volleyball. These teams have games, competitions, and tournaments that they compete in throughout the year.

Hockey Academy 
Students have the opportunity to join the Hockey Academy. They get an in-depth chance to practice their skills. They play more often and have more training. Students in the academy have an altered schedule as they have practice during out of schedule hours. This is an option for both junior high and senior high students. Many athletes graduate from this program and move on to play for professional teams.

Soccer Academy 
Students have the opportunity to join the Soccer Academy. They get an in-depth chance to practice their skills. They play more often and have more training. Students in the academy have an altered schedule as they have practice during out of schedule hours. This is an option for both junior high and senior high students.

Elite Athlete Program 
Trained student athletes are given specialized programs that fit into their training schedule. This allows them to continue their training, while also completing the courses required by Alberta Education.

Traditions
Over the years, students have created traditions, especially among the grade 12 graduating class. Most noteworthy is the year end water fight between grade twelve students, and a graduation prank. After incidents of breaking into the school and one year where crickets were set loose in the school, the school staff has tried to stop these traditions. They have been unsuccessful. The Student Union is in charge of o most of the traditional events.

Other traditions include 
 Touch of Class - as part of the preparation for graduation, the grade 12 students traditionally have their grad pictures taken before their graduation date. All high school students come in in their best formal wear for the day.
 Marathon Dance - a school dance where students dance for a time to earn money for charity. The marathon dance was discontinued for a few years, but was reinstated in 2010.
 Students vs Teachers Volleyball game - the varsity girls' and boys' Volleyball teams play against the teachers during lunch period, and part of the third period after the season is over; students are allowed to watch.
 Dodgeball Tournament - High school students create teams of six to compete in a game of dodgeball during lunch. The winning team is allowed to play against the teachers in the final match. Though it is not officially an event every year, student council has consistently organized this throughout the years.

Mascot

The school has two mascots, one is the Baron, and the other is a non-descript animal called "Louis" because of the name of the school. The event they never miss is the S.M.A.S.H. Tournament where most students are present. Notably, they do not appear in many school games because the audience for the games are small. Each year, auditions are held to determine the mascot but the results are kept secret to everyone except the student council, to ensure his identity is hidden.

The mascot is a grey animal with brownish red hair. It wears a green jersey, with the school team's name on it. The Baron mascot is similar to the logo, a warrior with a green helmet, green uniform, while holding a green and gold shield and a gold sword.

Notable alumni
Members of the band Ten Second Epic
James Rajotte, MP
Natasha Staniszewski, sports reporter of CFRN-TV
Luke Prokop, professional ice hockey player
Stuart Skinner, professional ice hockey player

References

External links

Louis St. Laurent School
Main Instagram Page
Fine arts Instagram page
Athletics Instagram Page
Student Union Instagram page
Fine arts YouTube page
Student Union

High schools in Edmonton
Catholic secondary schools in Alberta
International Baccalaureate schools in Alberta
Educational institutions in Canada with year of establishment missing